When Incubus Attacks, Vol. 1 is an EP that was released on August 22, 2000, by Incubus. The title is a parody of Cable's album title, When Animals Attack.

The tracks on this EP were recorded live during the 1999 and 2000 world tour of Make Yourself, as well as "Crowded Elevator", a song recorded during the recording of the Make Yourself album, previously unreleased outside of the Japanese pressing of Make Yourself, the European "Pardon Me" single, and the Australian "Drive" releases. A joke rap song, "We're Smoking The Herb Again", was recorded by the band and is a hidden track after "Pardon Me".

The US pressing of the EP was limited to 100,000 copies; however' the Canadian pressing is still widely available. The EP is also available online through the iTunes Store and many other online digital media stores.

Track listing 
"Pardon Me" (Acoustic) – 3:53
"Stellar" (Acoustic) – 3:15
"Make Yourself" (Acoustic) – 3:23
"Crowded Elevator" – 4:46
"Favorite Things" (Live) – 3:56
"Pardon Me" (Live) – 8:23
"We're Smokin' the Herb Again" (Hidden track) – 4:47  – 8:23
 On the Canadian version, this is track 7.

Origin of tracks
 1997 – S.C.I.E.N.C.E. ("Favorite Things" (Live))
 1999 – Make Yourself ("Pardon Me" (acoustic), "Stellar" (acoustic), "Make Yourself" (acoustic) and "Pardon Me" (live))
 2000 – Scream 3 Soundtrack ("Crowded Elevator")
 "Crowded Elevator" was also written during the Make Yourself writing sessions, but did not make it onto Make Yourself (except on the Japanese version)

Personnel
Brandon Boyd – lead vocals (except on "We're Smokin' the Herb Again")
Mike Einziger – guitar, shared lead vocals on "We're Smokin' the Herb Again"
Dirk Lance – bass guitar
Jose Pasillas – drums, shared lead vocals on "We're Smokin' the Herb Again"
Chris Kilmore – turntables, shared lead vocals on "We're Smokin' the Herb Again"

Charts
Album

References

Incubus (band) albums
2000 EPs
Live EPs
2000 live albums
Epic Records albums